Koh-i-Chiltan (”Mount Chiltan”) is a peak located in the Chiltan mountain group of the Sulaiman Mountains, in the Quetta District of Balochistan Province, in western Pakistan.

Koh-i-Chiltan is the summit of a steep, rocky mountain called Chiltan or Chehel-Tan (Persian/Balochi: "Forty Bodies"). There are many juniper trees found in high ranges.

Koh-i-Chiltan legends
Koh-i-Chiltan is said to be haunted.  A local story about the mountain tells the tale:

A frugal couple, married for many years, were unblessed with offspring. They therefore sought the advice of a holy man, who rebuked the wife, saying that he had not the power to grant her what Heaven had denied. The priest's son, however (also a mullah), felt convinced he could satisfy her wishes, and cast forty pebbles into her lap, at the same time praying that she might bear children. In process of time she was delivered of forty babies rather more than she wished or knew how to provide for. The poor husband at his wits' end ascended to the summit of Chehel-Tan with thirty-nine and left them there trusting to the mercy of the Deity to provide for them while the fortieth baby was brought up under the paternal roof.
One day, however, touched by remorse the wife unknown to her husband explored the mountain with the object of collecting the bones of her children and burying them. To her surprise, they were all living and gambolling among the trees and rocks. Wild with joy she ran back to her dwelling brought out the fortieth babe and placing it on the summit of the mountain left it there for a night to allure back its brothers but on returning in the morning she found that the latter had carried it off and it was never seen again. It is by the spirits of these forty babies that Chehel-Tan is said to be haunted.

See also 
 Hazarganji-Chiltan National Park
 Geography of Balochistan, Pakistan 
 List of mountains in Pakistan
 Mountain ranges of Pakistan

References

The type section is chiltan ranges, the formation is mainly consist of dark gray massive bedded limestone forms thick bands with rough surface (3–20 ft) thick, 
the limestone is highly resistant and it forms some of the highest mountains around the quetta valley, 
the chiltan formation is underlined by shrinab formation (shrinab valley)  the lower contact is transitional and upper contact is represented by an abrupt change in lithology from limestone to sembar shale.
https://www.msn.com/en-xl/asia/pakistan/pair-of-rare-persian-leopards-spotted-on-mount-chaltan/ar-AAKcrd1

External links
 Ncbi.nlm.nih.gov

Sulaiman Mountains
Mountains of Balochistan (Pakistan)
Quetta District
Reportedly haunted locations in Pakistan
Three-thousanders of the Hindu Kush